Doftana was a Romanian prison, sometimes referred to as "the Romanian Bastille". Built in 1895 in connection with the nearby salt mines, from 1921 it began to be used to detain political prisoners, among them Gheorghe Gheorghiu-Dej, who was the Prime Minister of Romania (1952–1955), and the Chairman of the State Council of Romania (1961–1965), and Nicolae Ceaușescu, who was General Secretary of Romanian Communist Party (1965–1989), and the first President of Romania (1968–1989).

The prison is situated close to the village with the same name, in the Telega commune of Prahova County.

Newspapers & Museums

From 1924 it is noted that the inmates began to write and edit a newspaper by hand using paper slips and smuggled pencils. It went by various names such as Doftana Red and Bolsheviks Handcuffed.

During the communist period of Romania just after World War II, it was transformed into a museum, which has since been deserted due to lack of funds.. The composer Alfred Mendelssohn wrote The Destruction of Doftanas, a symphonic poem about it.

Not only Romanian communists were imprisoned here, also captured German and Soviet soldiers and Hungarian civilians.

Notable inmates
Gheorghe Apostol
Iosif Ardeleanu
Max Auschnitt
Emil Bodnăraș
Mihail Gheorghiu Bujor
Nicolae Ceaușescu
Corneliu Zelea Codreanu
Alexandru Drăghici
Ștefan Foriș
Gheorghe Gheorghiu-Dej
Max Goldstein
Alexandru Moghioroș
Serghei Nicolau
Gheorghe Pintilie
Grigore Preoteasa
Horia Sima
Chivu Stoica
Richard Wurmbrand

References

External links
"Puşcăria Doftana se mistuie in chinuri capitaliste", Cotidianul

Defunct prisons in Romania
Buildings and structures in Prahova County
1895 establishments in Romania
19th-century architecture in Romania